David Riley (born November 28, 1988) is an American college basketball coach who is the current head coach of the Eastern Washington Eagles men's basketball team.

Playing career
Riley grew up in Palo Alto, California. He played college basketball at Whitworth University under Jim Hayford. While starring for the Pirates, Riley was a three-time All-Northwest Conference first-team selection and finished his career ranked fourth all-time in points with 1,664 along with making four NCAA Division III men's basketball tournament appearances, including two Sweet Sixteens and an Elite Eight.

Coaching career
When Hayford accepted the head coaching position at Eastern Washington, Riley followed as a graduate assistant coach. He would be elevated to director of basketball operations two years later, then in 2014 as a full assistant coach. In his first year as an assistant, the Eagles were won both the regular season and Big Sky tournament titles en route to the school's second ever NCAA tournament appearance in 2015. After Hayford accepted the head coaching position at Seattle, Riley stayed on staff under new coach and fellow assistant Shantay Legans. Riley would be a part of a Big Sky regular season title in 2020, along with a Big Sky tournament title the following year for a berth in the 2021 NCAA tournament.

On March 22, 2021, Legans accepted the head coaching position at Portland and four days later, Eastern Washington promoted Riley to head coach.

Personal life
Riley's father is an anesthesiologist at Stanford, while his uncle Mike Riley is the former head football coach at Oregon State and Nebraska.

Head coaching record

References

1988 births
Living people
American men's basketball coaches
Basketball coaches from California
Basketball players from California
College men's basketball head coaches in the United States
Eastern Washington Eagles men's basketball coaches
Sportspeople from Palo Alto, California
Whitworth Pirates men's basketball players